Célio Antonio Pompeu (born December 10, 1999) is a Brazilian soccer player who plays as a winger for St. Louis City in Major League Soccer.

References 

1999 births
Brazilian expatriate footballers
Brazilian expatriate sportspeople in the United States
Brazilian footballers
Living people
MLS Next Pro players
VCU Rams men's soccer players